Titu may refer to the following people:
Given name
Titu Andreescu (born 1956), Romanian mathematician
Titu Cusi (1529–1571), Inca emperor
Titu Maiorescu (1840–1917), Romanian literary critic and politician

Surname
Gheorge Titu, Romanian canoer
Saiful Bari Titu (born 1969), Bangladeshi football coach and former player 

Romanian masculine given names